A Man Called "Bee": Studying the Yanomamo is a 1974 film by ethnographic filmmakers Tim Asch and Napoleon Chagnon. While  he was studying the Yanomamo people, Napoleon Chagnon used many different ethnographic research methods. Some of those methods included participant observation, key informants, tape recording and in depth interviews. Ethnography is based on fieldwork. In order for Chagnon to create this film about the Yanomamo people, he had to take part in their events he was observing, describing, and analyzing.

Awards and festivals
 CINE Golden Eagle
 American Film Festival Red Ribbon
 Film Council of Greater Columbus, Chris Bronze Award

References

External links
Preview: A Man Called "Bee": Studying the Yanomamo (YouTube)

A Man Called "Bee": Studying the Yanomamo at Documentary Educational Resources

1974 films
Yanomami in film
Anthropology documentary films
Films directed by Timothy Asch
1970s English-language films